1/11 may refer to:
January 11 (month-day date notation)
November 1 (day-month date notation)
1st Battalion, 11th Marines, an artillery battalion of the United States Marine Corps